Adrenaline Mob is an American heavy metal supergroup formed in early 2011 by singer Russell Allen, guitarist Mike Orlando and drummer Mike Portnoy. The band's current lineup consists of Allen, Orlando, and drummer Jordan Cannata.

History 
The band was formed in early 2011 and had its first live performance on June 24, 2011, at the Hiro Ballroom in New York City, with the addition of bass player Paul Di Leo (Fozzy) and rhythm guitarist Rich Ward (Stuck Mojo/Fozzy). They released a YouTube video of a cover version of the Black Sabbath song "The Mob Rules" on June 27, 2011, to promote the band. On New Year's Eve 2011, Adrenaline Mob announced via their Facebook page that they would release their debut full-length studio album Omertà on March 13, 2012, and also revealed the album art.

In January 2012,  Adrenaline Mob announced the departures of Rich Ward and Paul Di Leo due to scheduling conflicts with their other bands. John Moyer of Disturbed was later revealed as the band's new bass player. He made his on-stage debut with the group in March 2012 at New York City's Hiro Ballroom, a day before the release of Omertà.

The band released an EP of cover songs entitled Covertá on March 12, 2013.

In June 2013, Mike Portnoy announced via Adrenaline Mob's Facebook page that he would be playing four more shows with the band before departing. Portnoy cited scheduling conflicts that prevented him from being able "to fully commit to the band's future activities at the moment".

The band released its second studio album, Men of Honor, on February 18, 2014, in North America and on February 24, 2014, internationally. Portnoy was replaced by A. J. Pero of Twisted Sister.

In August 2014, Moyer informed his fans via Facebook and Twitter that he would not be joining Adrenaline Mob on an upcoming planned tour. In response, Adrenaline Mob announced that they were in search of a new bass player, effectively ending Moyer's tenure with the band. Shortly after, the band selected Erik Leonhardt as its new bass player. The group released a covers album, Dearly Departed, through Century Media on February 9, 2015, in Europe (digital only) and on February 10 in North America.

On March 20, 2015, drummer A.J. Pero was found unresponsive on the band's tour bus. Band members attempted but failed to wake him. The band was traveling from Baltimore to Poughkeepsie. Pero was taken to a hospital where he was declared dead from an apparent heart attack. He was 55 years old. The next day, the band performed in New Jersey with several drummers filling in for Pero, including Chad Szeliga, Johnny Kelly, and former Adrenaline Mob drummer Mike Portnoy.

On March 22, 2017, the band announced the release of a new album called We the People, with its title, album artwork and some songs inspired by the 2016 United States presidential election. They also announced a new bass player and drummer: David "Dave Z" Zablidowsky (Trans-Siberian Orchestra, Jeff Scott Soto band) and Jordan Cannata, respectively.

While traveling to St. Petersburg, Florida for a concert in July 2017, the band's RV had pulled off I-75 in Micanopy, Florida due to a flat tire. It was then hit by a tractor trailer. Later that night, former drummer Mike Portnoy confirmed via Twitter that bassist David Zablidowsky had been killed. Band members Mike Orlando, Russell Allen, and Jordan Cannata were also seriously injured in the accident. Janet "Jane Train" Rains, the band's tour manager, was seriously injured in the accident, suffering significant burns. She had been taken to the University of Florida Health Shands Burn Center in Gainesville, where she remained for five weeks until her death on August 23 as a result of her injuries.

Band members 

Current members
Russell Allen – lead vocals (2011–present), live bass (2012; 2014; 2017–present)
Mike Orlando – lead guitar, backing vocals (2011–present), rhythm guitar (2012–present), studio bass (2012; 2014; 2017–present)
Jordan Cannata – drums (2016–present)

Former members
Mike Portnoy – drums, percussion, backing vocals (2011–2013)
Paul Di Leo – bass, backing vocals (2011–2012)
Rich Ward – rhythm guitar (2011–2012)
John Moyer – bass, backing vocals (2012–2014)
A. J. Pero – drums (2013–2015, died 2015)
Erik Leonhardt – bass, backing vocals (2014–2017)
David Zablidowsky – bass (2017, died 2017)

Live musicians
Chad Szeliga – drums (2015–2016)
Johnny Kelly – drums (2015)
Jay Jay French – guitars (2015)Timeline Discography Studio albumsEPs Awards and nominations Metal Hammer Awards (GER)'''

|-
| 2012 || Adrenaline Mob || Best Debut ||

References

External links 

2011 establishments in New York City
Heavy metal musical groups from New York (state)
Heavy metal supergroups
Musical groups established in 2011
Musical groups from New York City